Cecilia María Pinzón Vergara, known as Chavelita Pinzón, is a Panamanian folklorist and singer, one of the most recognized figures in her country's folk scene. She has taken Panamanian dance troupes on domestic tours and to several cities abroad, including Washington D.C. and New York.

Early life
Chavelita Pinzón's mother is a native of Guararé in Los Santos District, and her father was born in La Chorrera District. She holds a licentiate in philosophy and letters with a specialization in pedagogy from the University of Panama.

From there she directed and organized the country's first typical children's ensemble.

She has been a teacher at the Instituto Normal Rubiano, and was part of the Tobías Plicet typical ensemble. With this group she went to Buenos Aires, Argentina in 1961, where they won second prize for international folklore, and Pinzón won the prize for first vocalist.

She is a well-known Tamborera singer.

Presentations abroad
Chavelita Pinzón has brought Panamanian music and typical dances to prominent venues outside the country. In 1979, the first generation of her children's folkloric ensemble attended the Children's Festival, held in Washington D.C., where they had the opportunity to perform for President Jimmy Carter.

In 2001, her folkloric ensemble participated in the Children's Art Festival held in Naples, Italy. During this visit her students shared an audience with Pope John Paul II at the Vatican.

Recognition 
In 1993, Pinzón was recognized with the Order of Vasco Núñez de Balboa.

In 2003, she was the standard bearer for the 148th anniversary of La Chorrera District, where she highlighted the importance of its traditional dances, which she defined as "the only ones of their kind in the entire Republic".

For her outstanding career as a folklorist, in 2003 she was honored at the National Handicrafts Fair with a plaque of recognition and the official establishment of a children's folkloric ensemble contest in her honor.

On 28 November 2006, the town of Betania named her Meritorious Daughter during the parade celebrating Panama's independence from Spain.

She received an honorary diploma from the National Institute of Culture for her dedication as an educator and promoter of Panamanian folklore.

References

21st-century Panamanian women singers
21st-century Panamanian singers
Folklorists
Living people
Panamanian educators
20th-century Panamanian women singers
20th-century Panamanian singers
University of Panama alumni
Women folklorists
Year of birth missing (living people)